East Bilney is a village and former civil parish, now in the parish of Beetley, in the Breckland district, in the county of Norfolk, England. In 1931, the parish had a population of 117.

History
The Fen Causeway, a Roman road between Denver and Durobrivae, passed through the village and there is further evidence of a Roman settlement.

East Bilney's name is of Anglo-Saxon origin and derives from the Old English for the eastern portion of 'Billa's' island.

East Bilney has no listing in the Domesday Book but the land that forms the village today was part of the East Anglian estates of William de Warenne, the Lord of Gressenhale.

On 1 April 1935, the parish was abolished and merged with Beetley.

Geography
East Bilney falls within the constituency of Mid Norfolk and is represented at Parliament by George Freeman MP of the Conservative Party. For the purposes of local government, the parish falls within the district of Breckland.

St. Mary's Church
East Bilney's parish church is dedicated to Saint Mary and was built in the early Nineteenth Century to replace a ramshackle Medieval church on the same site, which was incidentally drawn by John Berney Ladbrooke in the 1820s. St. Mary's has good examples of stained glass depicting Saint Michael and Saint Alban installed by James Powell and Sons and a depiction of the Sixteenth Century martyr Thomas Bilney installed by Shrigley and Hunt. In addition, there is evidence to suggest that the tower and chancel of St. Mary's were destroyed during Kett's Rebellion of 1549.

Notable Residents
 Andrew Perne (ca. 1519 – 1589)- Vice-Chancellor of Cambridge University and Dean of Ely

War Memorial
East Bilney's war memorial takes the form of a stone obelisk located in St. Mary's Churchyard. The memorial lists the following names for the First World War:
 Lieutenant Douglas F. Hervey (1896-1917), 1/5th Battalion, Royal Norfolk Regiment
 Corporal William Isbell (d.1917), 1st Battalion, Royal Norfolk Regiment
 Private Victor B. B. King (1895-1916), 2nd Canterbury Regiment, New Zealand Expeditionary Force
 Private Arthur L. Barnard (1896-1918), 1/8th Battalion, Royal Scots

The following individuals are not listed on the memorial yet died during the First World War and had a link to the village:
 Rifleman Ernest R. Faircloth (d.1918), 2nd Battalion, Royal Irish Rifles
 Stuart C. Pratt

References

Villages in Norfolk
Former civil parishes in Norfolk
Breckland District